Mohammad Ali ( – 13 November 2020) was a Bangladesh Awami League politician who was the member of parliament for Cox's Bazar-4.

Career
Ali was elected to parliament from Cox's Bazar-4 as a Bangladesh Awami League candidate in 2001.

Death 
Ali died on 13 November 2020 in Cox's Bazar Sadar Hospital, Cox's Bazar.

References

Awami League politicians
2020 deaths
7th Jatiya Sangsad members
Year of birth missing